James (Jim) Zalesky is an American college wrestling coach and is currently the head coach of the University of Jamestown. He was the head wrestling coach for the Oregon State Beavers and a member of the National Wrestling Hall of Fame.  Prior to joining the Beavers, he was the coach of the University of Iowa wrestling team from 1998 to 2006. At Iowa, he succeeded Dan Gable as head coach, under whom he was a three-time NCAA champion.  He guided the Hawkeyes to NCAA team championships in 1998, 1999, and 2000.

Career

Wrestling
Jim was a four-time All-American at Iowa from 1981 to 1984.  He won the NCAA individual title in the 158 pound division in 1982, 1983, and 1984.  He went undefeated his last two years, ending his college career with an 89 match winning streak.  At the 1984 NCAA Championships he was named Most Outstanding Wrestler. Amateur Wrestling News named him "Wrestler of the Decade" for the 1980s.  This occurred as part of a streak during which the University of Iowa wrestling team won seven consecutive national titles.

He narrowly missed earning a position on the Olympic wrestling team by finishing second in the 163 pound division at the U.S. National competition.

Zalesky is a member of the United States Coaches Association, and was inducted into the National Wrestling Hall of Fame in 2004.

Coaching
Despite coaching the Hawkeyes to three NCAA team championships in nine years, with a runner-up finish as recently as 2004 and a 4th Place finish in 2006, Zalesky was fired as Iowa's head coach on March 30, 2006.  Athletic Director Bob Bowlsby cited a decline in the program under Zalesky and the need for a change as the reasons.

Oregon State's prior head coach, Joe Wells, retired a few days later leaving the program on a high note ending with a 13–2–1 record for the 2005–06 season.  Zalesky was announced as Oregon State's new head coach on April 14, 2006. Under Zalesky, the Beavers won seven Pac-12 team titles from 2006 to 2020. The Beavers were 147-75-2 in dual meets during Zalesky's tenure. On March 9, 2020, Zalesky was dismissed as head coach by Oregon State University.

On May 4, 2021 the University of Jamestown in North Dakota hired Zalesky as the new men's wrestling coach.

His NCAA coaching record is 274-109-2, and he has coached over 50 NCAA All-Americans.

References

American male sport wrestlers
American wrestling coaches
Iowa Hawkeyes wrestlers
Iowa Hawkeyes wrestling coaches
Oregon State Beavers wrestling coaches
Living people
Year of birth missing (living people)